Gay is a nickname usually derived as a diminutive form of the given names Gaylene, Gayleen, or Gaylen for women, and Gaylord, or Gabriel for men. It is the nickname of the following people:

 Gay Bryan (born 1927), American male long and triple jumper who competed in the 1940s and 1950s
 Gay Byrne (born 1934), Irish presenter of radio and televisionmost notable role was first host of The Late Late Show over a 37-year period from 1962 until 1999
 Gay McManus (born 1958), Irish retired Gaelic footballer with the Galway senior team
 Gay Mitchell (born 1951), Irish former Fine Gael politician
 Gay O'Driscoll (born 1946), Irish retired Gaelic footballer
 Gay Seabrook (1901–1970), American film, Broadway and radio actress 
 Gay Thompson (born 1948), Australian Labor member for the electoral district of Reynell from 1997 to 2014
Masaki Sumitani who also goes by the name of Hard Gay / Hardo Gay

See also 

 Gay Gordons (disambiguation)

Lists of people by nickname